K3 en het Ijsprinsessje (aka: K3 and the Little Ice Princess) is a 2006 Flemish pre-teen adventure film written by Hans Bourlon and Gert Verhulst, directed by Indra Siera, and starring the women of the K3 girl group in a sequel to their 2004 film K3 en het Magisch Medaillon. The sequel was shown on Zappelin, SBS 6, Ketnet, Kindernet and RTL Telekids.

Plot
King Flurkentijn (Peter Faber) invites the members of K3 (Karen Damen, Kristel Verbeke, Kathleen Aerts) to fairyland to sing for Princess Fleur (Laurien  Poelemans) because he hopes that they can cheer her up. But as the princess has been cursed by an evil wizard (Urbanus), the trio are unable to. They decide to undo the curse, and learn that they need to find out the wizard's real name within 24 hours in order to cancel it. While seeking his name, they interact with fairy tale figures, including Snow White (Sasha Rosen), Hansel & Gretel (Florian Slangen and Kato Bijteboer), Little Red Riding Hood (Mathilde Geysen) and Alladin (Mimoun Ouled Radi).

Cast

 Karen Damen as herself (K3)
 Kristel Verbeke as herself (K3)
 Kathleen Aerts as herself (K3)
 Peter Faber as King Flurkentijn
 Urbanus as Wizard Hatsjie
 Mimoun Ouled Radi as Alladin
 Annemarie Picard as Queen Bonbonia 
 Carry Tefsen as Witch
 Stany Crets as Lak
 Ben Segers as Kei
 Sasha Rosen as Snow White
 Laurien  Poelemans as Princess Fleur
 Nicky Langley as Helena 
 Katerine Avgoustakis as Lady in waiting 1
 Nicole Oerlemans as Lady in waiting 2 
 Bianca Vanhaverbeke as Lady in waiting 3
 Serge de Marre as Palace guard 
 Thomas van Hulle as Prince Arne
 Charles van der Aa as Little Princess
 Mathilde Geysen as Little Red Riding Hood
 Florian Slangen & Kato Bijteboer as Hansel & Gretel
 Frank Aendenboom as voice of frog
 Patrick Mallard as frog's puppeteer
 Suzy the Elephant
 Harrt Mallard as elephant trainer.

Soundtrack
The theme song "Trouwen" was not the only original K3-song used in the film. Other songs were "Cake en Chocolade" and "Betoverd" (Cursed).

Akk  songs were composed by Peter Gillis and performed by K3.
 "Trouwen"
 "Etiquetterap"
 "Cake met chocolade"
 "Meisje in de Spiegel"
 "Betoverd"

Reception
Cinemagazine praised the film, writing that in being intended for pre-teen audiences, the women of K3 kept the viewers in suspense throughout the film, keeping the film magical and fun to watch. The review concluded by saying the performances "are good and fun to watch. But the magical atmosphere created by the decor, costumes and editing is absolutely fantastic!"

References

External links
 . Archived 24 February 2008.
 

2000s Dutch-language films